Victoria Bruce may refer to:

Vicki Bruce
Vicky Bruce